Ruda Kameralna  is a village in the administrative district of Gmina Zakliczyn, within Tarnów County, Lesser Poland Voivodeship, in southern Poland. In the years 1975–1998 the administrative district belonged to the Tarnow Voivodship.

Ruda Kameralna is also a thematic village under the name: wioska pozytywnie zakręcona, roughly translated to "the positively twisted village" in reference to grinding corn for flour and butter churning activities of their tours. They also celebrate traditional folk holidays and rituals and the history of the village.

Etymology
The village is most likely named after their leading industry, the mining of iron ore as ruda means "ore". Kalmerana or kameralnym, means "intimate/cozy", commonly translated to "chamber" and likely derives from how the village is situated among the forests in a very peaceful place far from civilization.

History

14th century
In 1372, Paszko Tresta of Brzany, Gedcycze allowed the brothers Błażej and Filip from Tworkowa to establish the village of Ruda Kameralna south of Filipowice in the woods on the Świdnik Swamp.

Iron ore deposits were found in the area and exploited on a large scale in the Middle Ages. The ore was melted in cooking mugs and inverted in nearby Paleśnica. Salmon from the nearby stream was smoked and chopped and the water was used in the hammer mill to refine the iron they mined.

17th century
In 1655, Sweden invaded Poland in the Deluge and Ruda Kameralna remained under Swedish rule until 1660 after the Polish King John II Casimir renounced his claim to the Swedish crown.

18th century
In 1772, the village came under Austria-Hungarian rule and was considered part of historic Galicia. Although a village comprised completely of Poles, it was to remain part of Austria until the end of World War I. By 1795 Poland was no longer an independent Polish state and was partitioned between Brandenburg-Prussia, the Habsburg monarchy and Russia.

20th century
In the aftermath of World War I, the Polish people rose up in the Greater Poland Uprising on December 27, 1918. The fighting continued until June 28, 1919 when the Treaty of Versailles was signed and the village became part of the new Republic of Poland with the rest of West Galicia.

In 1939, Germany and the USSR invaded Poland and the country was again partitioned between the two nations. The town of Ruda Kameralna became part of Germany with its residents deprived of their voting rights and banned from non-Nazi political parties. They would remain under Germany rule until the end of World War II in 1945 when Poland once again was its own independent nation.

In 1971 a fire burned down the brick and mortar St. Mary Trinity Chapel. It was rebuilt the same year.

21st century
On July 23, 2001, there was flooding after torrential rains. The Rudzanka, a stream running through the village, turned into a great mass of brownish water that destroyed roads, houses, and farm buildings and forced the evacuation of the population.

Geography

Topography
Ruda Kameralna lies on the Rudzianka, a stream that flows down the mountains from the small village of Dzierżaniny in the south, to the Dunajec River in the north.

Demographics

2016

2009

1900 Austrian Census
There were an average of 5.7 inhabitants per home. The gender makeup of the town was 51% male and 49% female.

The ordinary language of the population was Polish and they had one elementary school.

1890 Austrian Census
There were an average of 6.2 inhabitants per home. The gender makeup of the town was 51.1% male and 48.9% female.

1880 Austrian Census
As per the 1880 Austrian Census of Galicia, there were 595 people in 116 houses residing in the village. There were an average of 5.1 inhabitants per home. The gender makeup of the town was 47.4% male and 52.6% female.

1869 Austrian Census
As per the 1869 Austrian Census of Galicia, there were 573 people in 127 houses residing in the village. There was an average of 4.5 inhabitants per home. The gender makeup of the town was 46.2% male and 53.8% female.

Places of interest

Great Southern Loop
It runs from Czchów to Gromnik through Ruda Kameralna.

Chapel of the Virgin Mary
The St. Mary Trinity Chapel was built in 1864 as a brick and plastered stone object. In 1971 it was destroyed in a fire, but was rebuilt in the same year. Three altars made from 1971 to 1975 exist inside the chapel.

19th century stone shrines
There are two 19th century stone shrines in the village made from whitewashed stone-thrown clay. One is square with a gabled roof and a recessed niche featuring a folk sculpture of Christ crucified and paintings of the Family and Heart of St. Mary. The other is in the shape of a slender post with softened corners which is wider at the top than the bottom. In that top are recesses containing porcelain figurines of angels and the Immaculate Conception of Mary.

Notable people
 Captain Jan "Salwa" Dubaniowski - Commander of the Bochnia District of the Polish Armed Forces on September 27, 1947
 Józef Kumorek - son of Jan and Katarzyny, born July 17, 1883 in Ruda Kameralna, died in Tarnów prison on December 29, 1940 from heart problems. He was one of an estimated 25,000 prisoners of the Germans during their occupation of Tarnów in World War II.
 Stanisław Rozkocha - folk sculptor
 Anderzej Różowski - Previous mayor of Ruda Kameralna

References

Ruda Kameralna